Greyhound Derby can refer to one of several important competitions for racing greyhounds;

 English Greyhound Derby, run at Nottingham Greyhound Stadium
 Irish Greyhound Derby, run at Shelbourne Park
 Scottish Greyhound Derby, run at Shawfield Stadium
 Welsh Greyhound Derby, discontinued event run at Cardiff Arms Park until 1977